was a Japanese daimyō of the late Edo period, who ruled the Tokushima Domain. He was a son of the eleventh  shōgun, Tokugawa Ienari.

Biography

As stated above, Narihiro was a son of the 11th shōgun, Ienari. Ienari had many children, who were given in adoption to various daimyō families throughout the country; Narihiro was given to the Tokushima lord, Hachisuka Narimasa, as an adopted heir. Narihiro succeeded to family headship in 1843, and engaged in a variety of reforms, intended to ease the issues of peasant revolt which Narimasa's mismanagement had caused. He continued his headship until 1868, when he was succeeded by Hachisuka Mochiaki.

Family
 Father: Tokugawa Ienari
 Mother: Oyae no Kata (?-1843) later Kaishun'in
 Wife: Takatsukasa Shinako (1820-1858), daughter of Takatsukasa Masamichi
 Children:
 Kayohime (1848-1865), died young and was a fiancée of Matsudaira Mochiaki 
 Hachisuka Mochiaki

Ancestry

References

1821 births
1868 deaths
Hachisuka clan
Tokugawa clan
Tozama daimyo